Below is a complete list of the Portuguese records in swimming, which are ratified by Portuguese Swimming Federation (FPN).

Long course (50 m)

Men

Women

Mixed relay

Short Course (25 m)

Men

Women

Mixed relay

References
General
Portuguese Long Course Records 18 February 2023 updated
Portuguese National Relay Long Course Records 10 August 2022 updated
Portuguese Short Course Records 28 February 2023 updated
Portuguese National Relay Short Course Records 16 January 2023 updated
Specific

External links 
FPN web site (Portuguese)
Portuguese Records swimrankings.net 11 February 2023 updated

Portugal
Records
Swimming
Swimming